Nyanga (Ginyanga) is a Guang language of Togo.

References

Guang languages
Languages of Togo